Obioma Okoli (born 3 June 1992) is a Nigerian weightlifter. She competed in the women's 63 kg event at the 2014 Commonwealth Games where she won a silver medal.

References

External links

1992 births
Living people
Sportspeople from Lagos
Nigerian female weightlifters
Commonwealth Games gold medallists for Nigeria
Commonwealth Games silver medallists for Nigeria
Weightlifters at the 2014 Commonwealth Games
Commonwealth Games medallists in weightlifting
Weightlifters at the 2010 Commonwealth Games
20th-century Nigerian women
21st-century Nigerian women
Medallists at the 2014 Commonwealth Games